The 2009 Women's World Open Squash Championship is the women's edition of the World Open, which serves as the individual world championship for squash players. The championship is part of the WISPA Platinum series of the Women's International Squash Players' Association (WISPA) World Tour. The event took place in Amsterdam in the Netherlands from 20 to 27 September 2009.

Ranking points
In 2009, the points breakdown were as follows:

Seeds

Draw and results

Note: * Q = Qualifier, * WC = Wild Card, * w/o = Walkover, * r = Retired

See also
World Open
2009 Men's World Open Squash Championship

References

External links
 Official Website
 World Open 2009 draws

World Squash Championships
W
2000s in Amsterdam
Squash tournaments in the Netherlands
Women's World Open Squash Championship, 2009
2009 in Dutch sport
2009 in women's squash
September 2009 sports events in Europe